The 2022 Monterey Bay FC season was the club's first season since their establishment on February 1, 2021.  The club made its league debut in the USL Championship as well as its domestic cup debut in the U.S. Open Cup.

Background 
Monterey Bay FC was established on February 1, 2021, as the result of owner Ray Beshoff retaining USL Championship franchise rights from Fresno FC which folded in 2019. Frank Yallop was initially announced as the team's sporting director on February 1, and on April 12, 2021, he named Ramiro Corrales to the role of Technical Advisor. Yallop and Corrales were named to the roles of manager and assistant-manager respectively on April 22, 2021.

Season squad

Transfers

In

Loans out

Transfers out

Competitions

Friendlies

USL Championship

Western Conference

Results by round

Matches

U.S. Open Cup 

Monterey Bay FC made their Open Cup debut in the Second Round.

References 

Monterey Bay FC
Monterey Bay FC
Monterey Bay FC